The Earl and the Fairy is a 2008 Japanese anime series produced by Artland, directed by Koichiro Sohtome and scripts composed by Noriko Nagao. Two pieces of theme music will be used, one opening theme and one ending theme. The opening theme, "Feeling", is performed by Acid Flavor while the ending theme, "My Fairy", is performed by Hikaru Midorikawa, who is also the voice actor for the male protagonist of the story, Edgar J. C. Ashenbert. The anime is scheduled for 12 episodes and will air first on Chiba TV and TV Saitama on October 8, 2008; however, an advanced broadcast of the first episode was aired on AT-X on September 29, 2008.

Episode list

References

Episode 1 @ Official Site 
Episode 2 @ Official Site 
Episode 3 @ Official Site 
Episode 4 @ Official Site 
Episode 5 @ Official Site 
Episode 6 @ Official Site 
Episode 7 @ Official Site 
Episode 8 @ Official Site 
Episode 9 @ Official Site 
Episode 10 @ Official Site 
Episode 11 @ Official Site 
Episode 12 @ Official Site

External links
 Anime official site (this link is broken leads to adult site) 
 
 Shueisha's pages for the first and second drama CDs 

Earl and the Fairy, The